CBDN may refer to:

 CBDN (AM), a radio rebroadcaster (560 AM) licensed to Dawson, Yukon Territory, Canada, rebroadcasting CFWH
 CBDN-FM, a radio rebroadcaster (104.9 FM) licensed to Dawson, Yukon Territory, Canada, rebroadcasting CBU-FM